Protosticta is a genus of shadowdamsel in the damselfly family Platystictidae. There are more than 50 described species in Protosticta.

Species
These 52 species belong to the genus Protosticta:

 Protosticta albifrons
 Protosticta anamalaica Sadasivan, Nair & Samuel, 2022
 Protosticta annulata Selys, 1886
 Protosticta antelopoides Fraser, 1931
 Protosticta beaumonti Wilson, 1997
 Protosticta bivittata Lieftinck, 1939
 Protosticta caroli van Tol, 2008
 Protosticta coomansi van Tol, 2000
 Protosticta curiosa Fraser, 1934
 Protosticta damacornu Terzani & Carletti, 1998
 Protosticta davenporti Fraser, 1931
 Protosticta feronia Lieftinck, 1933
 Protosticta foersteri Laidlaw, 1902
 Protosticta fraseri Kennedy , 1936
 Protosticta geijskesi van Tol, 2000
 Protosticta gracilis Kirby, 1889
 Protosticta grandis Asahina, 1985
 Protosticta gravelyi Laidlaw, 1915
 Protosticta hearseyi Fraser, 1922
 Protosticta himalaiaca Laidlaw, 1917
 Protosticta khaosoidaoensis Asahina, 1984
 Protosticta kiautai Zhou, 1986
 Protosticta kinabaluensis Laidlaw, 1915
 Protosticta lepteca van Tol, 2005
 Protosticta linduensis van Tol, 2000
 Protosticta linnaei van Tol, 2008
 Protosticta marenae van Tol, 2000
 Protosticta maurenbrecheri van Tol, 2000
 Protosticta medusa Fraser, 1934
 Protosticta monticola Emiliyamma & Palot, 2016
 Protosticta ngoai Phan & Kompier, 2016
 Protosticta nigra Kompier, 2017
 Protosticta pariwonoi van Tol, 2000
 Protosticta plicata van Tol, 2005
 Protosticta ponmudiensis Kiran, Kalesh & Kunte, 2015
 Protosticta proboscis Kompier, 2016
 Protosticta pseudocuriosa Phan & Kompier, 2016
 Protosticta reslae van Tol, 2000
 Protosticta robusta Fraser, 1933
 Protosticta rozendalorum van Tol, 2000
 Protosticta rufostigma Kimmins, 1958
 Protosticta sanguinostigma Fraser, 1922
 Protosticta satoi Asahina, 1997
 Protosticta simplicinervis Selys, 1885
 Protosticta socculus Phan & Kompier, 2016
 Protosticta spinosa Phan & Kompier, 2016
 Protosticta taipokauensis Asahina & Dudgeon, 1987
 Protosticta trilobata Fraser, 1933
 Protosticta tubau Dow, 2010
 Protosticta uncata Fraser, 1931
 Protosticta vanderstarrei van Tol, 2000
 Protosticta versicolor Laidlaw, 1913
 Protosticta zhengi Yu & Bu, 2009

References

Further reading

External links

 

Platystictidae
Articles created by Qbugbot